Centro Desportivo Universitário de Lisboa, or CDUL, is a Portuguese multisports club originally created for Lisbon's university students that evolved into a club for all ages, its prime sport being rugby. CDUL is the most decorated Portuguese rugby union team and was represented by four players at the 2007 Rugby World Cup finals. In 31/01/14 the senior rugby team won the 2014 main championship title after defeating GD Direito 19-15  While studying economics, the former Prime Minister and President of the Republic of Portugal Aníbal Cavaco Silva was an athlete of CDUL athletics department from 1958 to 1963.

On 6 January 2013, CDUL defeated Quesos Entrepinares by 24–13, winning their third Iberic Cup.

Honors
Campeonato Nacional Honra/Super Bock:
Winners (20): 1964, 1965, 1966, 1967, 1968, 1969, 1971, 1972, 1974, 1978, 1980, 1982, 1983, 1984, 1985, 1989, 1990, 2012, 2014, 2017
Taça de Portugal de Rugby:
Winners (8): 1968, 1977, 1979, 1986, 1988, 1989, 2013, 2015
Supertaça de Portugal de Rugby:
Winners (3): 1989, 1990, 2012
Taça Ibérica:
Winners (3): 1984, 1985, 2012

References

External links
CDUL website

University and college sports clubs in Portugal
Portuguese rugby union teams
Sports clubs established in 1952
Rugby clubs established in 1952
1952 establishments in Portugal
Sport in Lisbon